Wildwood Crest is a borough in Cape May County, in the U.S. state of New Jersey. It is part of the Ocean City metropolitan statistical area, in the South Jersey region of the state. As of the 2020 United States census, the borough's population was 3,101, a decrease of 169 (−5.2%) from the 2010 census count of 3,270, which in turn reflected a decline of 710 (−17.8%) from the 3,980 counted in the 2000 census.

Wildwood Crest was incorporated as a borough by an act of the New Jersey Legislature on April 6, 1910, from portions of Lower Township. The area of the borough was first developed by Philip Baker in the 1910s as a southern extension to the resort of Wildwood.  The borough's name comes from Wildwood, which in turn was named for the area's wild flowers.

It is a dry town, where alcohol cannot be sold, affirmed by the results of a referendum held in 1940. Wildwood Crest joins  Cape May Point and Ocean City among municipalities in Cape May restricting the sale of alcohol. Adjoining Wildwood allows the sale of alcohol, including at bars on its boardwalk.

The borough was ranked the second-best beach in New Jersey in the 2008 "Top 10 Beaches Contest" sponsored by the New Jersey Marine Sciences Consortium. Wildwood Crest is one of five municipalities in the state that offer free public access to oceanfront beaches monitored by lifeguards, joining Atlantic City, North Wildwood, Wildwood and Upper Township's Strathmere section.

History

The motels of Wildwood Crest are characterized by a distinctive "Doo Wop" or Googie style of architecture. Collectively, Wildwood and Wildwood Crest contain the nation's largest collection of mid-century "Doo Wop" resort architecture.

The term "Doo Wop" was coined by the Mid-Atlantic Center For The Arts in the early 1990s to describe the unique, space-age architectural style that was common in the 1950s and 1960s. Post World War II America was an optimistic, confident, and enthusiastic society. The new age style of architecture evolved into a showcase of colorful, flashy, modernistic architecture that captured the spirit of the times; it incorporated modern, sweeping angles, bright colors, starbursts, boomerang shapes, plastic palm trees, and angular wall and roof styles. "Doo Wop" was a celebration of the architecture, design, music, and pop culture of the 1950s and 1960s. During the 1950s, the economy had grown to unprecedented levels. Americans achieved a level of prosperity they had never known before. In response to this unprecedented growth, hundreds of motels were constructed in Wildwood and Wildwood Crest with the distinct "Doo Wop" style of architecture. The first motel to reflect this style was the Ebb Tide Motel, constructed in 1957, which was designed and built by Will and Lou Morey, who specialized in such designs.

Several "Doo Wop" motels, such as the Caribbean Motel, are registered on the National Register of Historic Places. In recent years, historic "Doo Wop" motels have been demolished to make way for the construction of condominiums, leading to organized efforts to preserve the remaining examples.

Wildwood Crest and its neighboring towns of Wildwood, North Wildwood, and West Wildwood make up "The Wildwoods" resort, a popular vacation destination for those living in all parts of New Jersey as well as the Philadelphia and New York City metropolitan areas. Many vacationers and tourists have come from as far away as, New England and Canada and have made The Wildwoods a vacation hotspot, due to the area's mild summer climate. Unlike its sister communities of Wildwood and North Wildwood, Wildwood Crest is generally set apart from the all-hours excitement that the resort area is known for. Many vacationers will find some of the quietest and most undisturbed beach space.

In recent years, condominiums have replaced many of the motels the area was known for, such as The Grand, The Ocean Breeze, El Coronado, and The Arcadia. Some restaurants have been torn down and replaced with condominiums, including The Captain's Table, The Surfside, and Duffenetti's.  These changes in housing have significantly changed the demographics of this area, from being a more family oriented one-vacation-per-summer place (for the middle class) to being a weekend retreat for wealthier families.

Geography

According to the United States Census Bureau, the borough had a total area of 1.48 square miles (3.84 km2), including 1.30 square miles (3.36 km2) of land and 0.19 square miles (0.48 km2) of water (12.50%).

Part of the borough's beachfront has been closed off for the protection of native birds such as the piping plover. These small birds have this area all to themselves so that their eggs may be protected from beachgoers. There is a nature trail one may take through the dunes to explore this sheltered area of the beach.

Wildwood Crest borders the Diamond Beach section of Lower Township to the south, the City of Wildwood to the north, and the Atlantic Ocean.

Demographics

2010 census

The Census Bureau's 2006–2010 American Community Survey showed that (in 2010 inflation-adjusted dollars) median household income was $46,111 (with a margin of error of +/− $13,652) and the median family income was $67,917 (+/− $15,113). Males had a median income of $49,567 (+/− $20,496) versus $54,250 (+/− $12,982) for females. The per capita income for the borough was $40,032 (+/− $8,687). About 8.1% of families and 11.6% of the population were below the poverty line, including 13.2% of those under age 18 and 5.2% of those age 65 or over.

2000 census
As of the 2000 U.S. census, there were 3,980 people, 1,833 households, and 1,114 families residing in the borough. The racial makeup of the borough was 94.87% White, 1.23% African American, 0.10% Native American, 0.48% Asian, 2.21% from other races, and 1.11% from two or more races. Hispanic or Latino of any race were 4.22% of the population.

There were 1,833 households, out of which 20.7% had children under the age of 18 living with them, 45.7% were married couples living together, 11.3% had a female householder with no husband present, and 39.2% were non-families. 34.6% of all households were made up of individuals, and 18.2% had someone living alone who was 65 years of age or older. The average household size was 2.17 and the average family size was 2.76.

In the borough, the population was spread out, with 18.2% under the age of 18, 5.9% from 18 to 24, 23.8% from 25 to 44, 26.6% from 45 to 64, and 25.5% who were 65 years of age or older. The median age was 47 years. For every 100 females, there were 87.2 males. For every 100 females age 18 and over, there were 84.4 males.

The median income for a household in the borough was $36,579, and the median income for a family was $47,462. Males had a median income of $42,727 versus $27,500 for females. The per capita income for the borough was $23,741. About 4.4% of families and 6.0% of the population were below the poverty line, including 1.1% of those under age 18 and 6.9% of those age 65 or over.

Economy
Portions of the borough—together with areas in North Wildwood, West Wildwood and Wildwood—are part of a joint Urban Enterprise Zone (UEZ), one of 32 zones covering 37 municipalities statewide. The four municipalities in The Wildwoods were selected in 2002 as one of a group of three zones added to participate in the program as part of a joint zone with. In addition to other benefits to encourage employment and investment within the Zone, shoppers can take advantage of a reduced 3.3125% sales tax rate (half of the % rate charged statewide) at eligible merchants. Established in September 2002, the borough's Urban Enterprise Zone status expires in December 2023. The joint UEZ is overseen by the Enterprise Zone Development Corporation of the Wildwoods Board, which includes representatives from all four municipalities.

Notable motels in Wildwood Crest include the Caribbean Motel, built in 1957 in the Doo-Wop style and added to the National Register of Historic Places on August 24, 2005.

Parks and recreation

The borough is bordered on the bay side by Sunset Lake. This was once connected to the Atlantic Ocean by Turtle Gut Inlet, which was closed in 1922. The Sunset Lake and Turtle Gut Park is located at New Jersey and Miami Avenues. A nearby memorial commemorates the Battle of Turtle Gut Inlet fought on June 29, 1776. This was the only American Revolutionary War battle fought in Cape May County.

Government

Local government

Wildwood Crest has been governed under the Walsh Act, by a three-member commission, since 1937. The borough is one of 30 municipalities (of the 564) statewide that use the commission form of government. The governing body is comprised of three commissioners, who are elected at-large on a non-partisan basis to serve concurrent four-year terms of office, with the vote taking place as part of the November general election. At a reorganization conducted after each election, the commission selects one of its members to serve as mayor and gives each commissioner an assigned department to oversee and operate. As part of an effort to reduce the costs of conducting a standalone election for commissioners and to generate greater participation from voters, the election for borough commissioners was shifted from May to November by an ordinance passed in 2012, with the first November election held in 2013.

, the Board of Commissioners consists of Mayor Don Cabrera (Commissioner of Public Works, Parks and Public Property),
Deputy Mayor Joseph Franco Jr.(Commissioner of Revenue and Finance), and Joseph Schiff (Commissioner of Public Safety, all serving concurrent terms of office ending December 31, 2025.

Federal, state, and county representation
Wildwood Crest is located in the 2nd Congressional District and is part of New Jersey's 1st state legislative district.

Politics
As of March 2011, there were a total of 2,341 registered voters in Wildwood Crest, of which 436 (18.6%) were registered as Democrats, 1,052 (44.9%) were registered as Republicans and 850 (36.3%) were registered as Unaffiliated. There were 3 voters registered as Libertarians or Greens.

In the 2012 presidential election, Republican Mitt Romney received 61.1% of the vote (1,046 cast), ahead of Democrat Barack Obama with 38.5% (659 votes), and other candidates with 0.4% (6 votes), among the 1,724 ballots cast by the borough's 2,419 registered voters (13 ballots were spoiled), for a turnout of 71.3%. In the 2008 presidential election, Republican John McCain received 59.2% of the vote (1,090 cast), ahead of Democrat Barack Obama, who received 39.6% (729 votes), with 1,842 ballots cast among the borough's 2,319 registered voters, for a turnout of 79.4%. In the 2004 presidential election, Republican George W. Bush received 60.4% of the vote (1,203 ballots cast), outpolling Democrat John Kerry, who received around 38.4% (766 votes), with 1,993 ballots cast among the borough's 2,644 registered voters, for a turnout percentage of 75.4.

In the 2013 gubernatorial election, Republican Chris Christie received 77.4% of the vote (920 cast), ahead of Democrat Barbara Buono with 20.9% (249 votes), and other candidates with 1.7% (20 votes), among the 1,233 ballots cast by the borough's 2,410 registered voters (44 ballots were spoiled), for a turnout of 51.2%. In the 2009 gubernatorial election, Republican Chris Christie received 60.8% of the vote (806 ballots cast), ahead of both Democrat Jon Corzine with 32.9% (436 votes) and Independent Chris Daggett with 4.5% (59 votes), with 1,325 ballots cast among the borough's 2,448 registered voters, yielding a 54.1% turnout.

Education 

The Wildwood Crest School District serves public school students in pre-kindergarten through eighth grade at Crest Memorial School. As of the 2019–20 school year, the district, comprised of one school, had an enrollment of 275 students and 34.4 classroom teachers (on an FTE basis), for a student–teacher ratio of 8.0:1.

For ninth through twelfth grades, public school students from Wildwood Crest attend Wildwood High School in Wildwood as part of a sending/receiving relationship with the Wildwood Public School District, together with students from North Wildwood and Wildwood Crest. As of the 2019–20 school year, the high school had an enrollment of 245 students and 29.9 classroom teachers (on an FTE basis), for a student–teacher ratio of 8.2:1.

Students are also eligible to attend Cape May County Technical High School in the Cape May Court House area, which serves students from the entire county in its comprehensive and vocational programs, which are offered without charge to students who are county residents. Special needs students may be referred to Cape May County Special Services School District in the Cape May Court House area.

Wildwood Catholic Academy in North Wildwood (prior to 2020 it was two separate schools: Cape Trinity Catholic elementary school and Wildwood Catholic High School) operates under the auspices of the Roman Catholic Diocese of Camden.

Cape May County Library operates the Wildwood Crest Library.

Transportation

Roads and highways

County Route 621 (Pacific Avenue/New Jersey Avenue) runs for  through the borough, from Lower Township to the south to Wildwood in the north.

Parking in the beach area of Wildwood Crest is regulated by parking meters between mid-May and mid-September.

Public transportation
NJ Transit provides bus service to Philadelphia on the 313 and 315 routes, with seasonal service to Philadelphia on the 316 route and to the Port Authority Bus Terminal in Midtown Manhattan on the 319 route.

The Great American Trolley Company operates trolley service in Wildwood Crest during the summer months. The company runs a trolley route that provides service from Wildwood Crest to the boardwalk at Schellenger Avenue in Wildwood daily during the evening hours. The Great American Trolley Company also runs trolley service to the Irish Fall Festival in North Wildwood, with a route connecting Wildwood Crest to the festival site during the weekend of the festival.

Landmarks 
 Crest Fishing Pier
  Sunset Lake

Climate
According to the Köppen climate classification system, Wildwood Crest, New Jersey has a humid subtropical climate (Cfa) with hot, moderately humid summers, cool winters and year-around precipitation. Cfa climates are characterized by all months having an average mean temperature > 32.0 °F (> 0.0 °C), at least four months with an average mean temperature ≥ 50.0 °F (≥ 10.0 °C), at least one month with an average mean temperature ≥ 71.6 °F (≥ 22.0 °C) and no significant precipitation difference between seasons. During the summer months in Wildwood Crest, a cooling afternoon sea breeze is present on most days, but episodes of extreme heat and humidity can occur with heat index values ≥ 95 °F (≥ 35 °C). During the winter months, episodes of extreme cold and wind can occur with wind chill values < 0 °F (< −18 °C). The plant hardiness zone at Wildwood Crest Beach is 7b with an average annual extreme minimum air temperature of 6.8 °F (−14.0 °C).

Ecology
According to the A. W. Kuchler U.S. potential natural vegetation types, Wildwood Crest, New Jersey would have a dominant vegetation type of Northern Cordgrass (73) with a dominant vegetation form of Coastal Prairie (20).

Notable people

People who were born in, residents of, or otherwise closely associated with Wildwood Crest include:
 J. Thompson Baker (1847–1919), one of the original developers of Wildwood and Wildwood Crest, who was also a politician who represented New Jersey's 2nd congressional district from 1913 to 1915
 Kenneth A. Black Jr. (1932–2019), politician who served in the New Jersey General Assembly from District 3A from 1968 to 1974
 Aliki Brandenberg (born 1929), children's literature author, was born in Wildwood Crest
 Joe Maloy (born 1985), professional triathlete
 Bill Osborn (born ), football scout and color analyst who played in the National Football League, World League and the Arena Football League
 Bernie Parent (born 1945), goalie for the Boston Bruins, Toronto Maple Leafs and most notably Philadelphia Flyers where he back-stopped the team to two consecutive Stanley Cups
 Frank Vogel (born 1973), head coach of the Los Angeles Lakers

Gallery

References

External links

 Wildwood Crest official website
 Wildwood Crest history

 
1910 establishments in New Jersey
Boroughs in Cape May County, New Jersey
Jersey Shore communities in Cape May County
New Jersey Urban Enterprise Zones
Populated places established in 1910
The Wildwoods, New Jersey
Walsh Act